Himantigera is a genus of flies in the family Stratiomyidae.

Species
Himantigera dichroa (Schiner, 1868)
Himantigera flavonigra (Lindner, 1928)
Himantigera fulvithorax (Bigot, 1879)
Himantigera jamesi (Lindner, 1969)
Himantigera nigrifemorata (Macquart, 1847)
Himantigera silvestris McFadden, 1982
Himantigera splendens (Schiner, 1868)
Himantigera superba (Lindner, 1949)

References

Stratiomyidae
Brachycera genera
Diptera of South America
Diptera of North America